John Thurston may refer to:

John Thurston (artist) (1774–1822), British wood-engraver and illustrator
John Thurston (basketball) (born 1948), US collegiate women's basketball coach
John Thurston (inventor) (fl. 1799–1850s), British furniture maker and the inventor of slate beds and rubber cushions for billiard tables
John Thurston (politician) (born 1972), Republican Arkansas Commissioner of State Lands, 2011–present
John Bates Thurston (1836–1897), independent Premier, and later British colonial Governor, of Fiji, 1888–97
John Mellen Thurston (1847–1916), Republican United States Senator from Nebraska
John Jabez Thurston (1888–1960), independent member of the Canadian House of Commons
Mel Thurston (1919–1997), born John Thurston, American professional basketball player